International Wrestling League (IWL) (Liga Internacional de Lucha Libre in Spanish) is a professional wrestling promotion based in Deportivo Tlalli, in Tlalnepantla, Mexico State.

It was founded as Independent Wrestling League on August 13, 2010 by Martín Amaro, with Octavio Rivero as the head booker. In late 2010 Rivero was replaced by Amaro's niece, Ángeles Rubio, under whom IWL started a working agreement with Perros del Mal Producciones. Rubio would leave the promotion for personal reasons in April 2011.
He was followed as the head booker by wrestler Fantasma de la Ópera, who started a working relationship with AAA. On May 28, 2011, it was announced that Fantasma de la Ópera would be replaced by Valerie Richter. In a press conference held on June 21, 2011, Richter announced that the company would change its name to International Wrestling League.

IWL was the first Mexican wrestling promotion to broadcast a live Internet pay-per-view. The iPPV was called "The Mad Man Takes Over Mexico!" and was aired on July 3, 2011. American hardcore wrestler Mad Man Pondo was the headliner in this show.

On July 15, 2011, Richter announced that IWL will incorporate a timekeeper, a ringbell and time limit for the matches, something that is common in the U.S. and Japan, but unheard of in Mexico. On January 4, 2012, Richter announced that she had parted ways with IWL due to creative differences.

Chief Executive Officer

Championships

IWL World Heavyweight Championship

IWL International Championship

IWL International Junior Heavyweight Championship

IWL International Tag Team Championship

IWL Trios Championship

IWL Internet Championship

IWL Lightweight Championship

Tournaments

See also

List of professional wrestling promotions in Mexico

Sources 
Official Facebook
IWL President Facebook

References

External links 
Official website (in Spanish)

Mexican professional wrestling promotions
Lucha libre
Sports organizations established in 2010